Meenakshi TV is a Tamil 24/7 television channel, owned by Meenakshi Networks Pvt ltd Chennai. The channel is a free-to-air and was launched in 2015. The channel is available across all major cable and SCV setup box sd Chennal 260 as well as online.

References

www.meenakshitv.in
www.meenakshitv.com

External links
 

Tamil-language television channels
Television channels and stations established in 2015
Tamil-language television stations
Television stations in Chennai
2015 establishments in Tamil Nadu